Ratan Singh may refer to:

 Ratnasimha (r. c. 1302-1303 CE), a Guhila ruler of Mewar; known as "Ratan Singh" in vernacular literature
 Ratan Singh II (died 1531), Maharana of Mewar
 Ratan Singh of Amber (died 1548), Raja of Amber
 Ratan Singh of Bharatpur (r. 1768-1769), a ruler of the Bharatpur princely state
 Ratan Singh (Bharatpur Member of Parliament), Indian National Congress politician from Rajasthan
 Ratan Singh (Kotma MLA), Indian politician and Member of Madhya Pradesh Legislative Assembly from Kotma constituency
 Ratan Singh Rathore, ruler of Ratlam.